Witches Steeped in Gold is a 2021 young adult dark fantasy novel by British Jamaican writer Ciannon Smart. Smart's debut novel inspired by Jamaican mythology was published on 20 April 2021 by HarperCollins and follows two enemy witches who must enter an alliance to fight a common enemy. It will be followed by a sequel, Empress Crowned in Red scheduled for release on May 10, 2022.

Development 
Smart first had the early inspiration for novel when she went on her second family trip to Jamaica when she was twelve years old and she did not start writing until she read  An Ember in the Ashes. When she was on the trip to Jamaica, she visited Rose Hall and became obsessed with the idea of Black witches. In writing the book she made several research about Obeah and Jamaican culture.
In an interview Smart stated that she was compelled to continue with the novel without fear after she heard the announcement of Children of Blood and Bone because it gave her hope about writing something different from the ones she had seen.

Plot 

Iraya has spent her life in a cell, but every day brings her closer to freedom - and vengeance.

Jazmyne is the Queen’s daughter, but unlike her sister before her, she has no intention of dying to strengthen her mother’s power.

Sworn enemies, these two witches enter a precarious alliance to take down a mutual threat. But power is intoxicating, revenge is a bloody pursuit, and nothing is certain - except the lengths they will go to win this game.

This Jamaican-inspired fantasy debut about two enemy witches who must enter into a deadly alliance to take down a common enemy has the twisted cat-and-mouse of Killing Eve with the richly imagined fantasy world of Furyborn and Ember in the Ashes.

Reception 
The book received generally positive reactions from reviewers and readers. It was one of the most anticipated books of 2021, and was recommended by several media outlets including The Mary Sue and USA Today.

A review from Tor.com stated that "Witches Steeped in Gold is a vicious series opener from a powerful debut novelist." A review from Kirkus Reviews called the novel "A richly realized tale for patient readers who enjoy complex language and worldbuilding". Publishers Weekly praised Ciannon Smart's worldbuilding stating that "Smart’s ornate world succeeds in its fantastical backdrops and frequent action".

References 

Debut fantasy novels
British fantasy novels
Young adult novel series
2021 debut novels
2021 fantasy novels
Jamaican novels
2021 British novels
British bildungsromans
Literature by African-American women
Young adult novels
Dark fantasy
HarperCollins books